Vitali Vladimirovich Belinski (sometimes Vitaly Belinsky;  — Vital' Uladzimiravich Bialinski; ; born November 27, 1989) is a Belarusian professional ice hockey goaltender who is currently playing for HK Mogilev in the Belarusian Extraleague .

Vitali started playing hockey at age of seven in Yunost-Minsk hockey school. He played for different clubs in Yunost-Minsk system (Yunior, Yunost-MHL, Yunost-Minsk) except seasons 2008—2009 and 2011—2012 when he played for HC Shinnik Bobruisk and HK Vitebsk respectively. During season 2012—2013 Yunost-Minsk played in the Higher Hockey League. Belinski was one of the two main goaltenders with Canadian-Belarusian Kevin Lalande. He played in 22 games with 91.8% saves (56 against 586), 2.53 GAA and 3 shutouts. On October 2, 2012 he was named the best goaltender of the league of the week.

He played for U-18 and U-20 teams of Belarus. His first game for the national team was against Germany on April 6, 2013. He was included in the Belarusian roster for 2013 IIHF World Championship. He is also one of two lowest players during this championship (only 170 cm).

References

External links

1989 births
Belarusian ice hockey goaltenders
Living people
Metallurg Zhlobin players
HK Mogilev players
KHK Red Star players
Shinnik Bobruisk players
HK Vitebsk players
Yunost Minsk players
Ice hockey people from Minsk
Universiade medalists in ice hockey
 Universiade silver medalists for Belarus
Competitors at the 2011 Winter Universiade